Kuntur Sayana (Quechua kuntur condor, sayana stop, whereabouts, a place where you stop frequently, "condor stop",  Hispanicized spelling Condorsayana) is a mountain in the Andes of Peru, about  high. It is located in the Puno Region, Lampa Province, Paratía District.

References

Mountains of Puno Region
Mountains of Peru